Seilergasse 8 is an East German film. It was released in 1960.

External links
 

1960 films
East German films
1960s German-language films
1960s German films